The 1969–70 Regionalliga  was the seventh season of the Regionalliga, the second tier of the German football league system. The league operated in five regional divisions, Berlin, North, South, Southwest and West. The five league champions and all five runners-up, at the end of the season, entered a promotion play-off to determine the two clubs to move up to the Bundesliga for the next season. The two promotion spots went to the Regionalliga Süd champions Kickers Offenbach and Regionalliga West runners-up Arminia Bielefeld.

Regionalliga Nord									
The 1969–70 season saw two new clubs in the league, Olympia Wilhelmshaven and SC Leu Braunschweig, both promoted from the Amateurliga, while no club had been relegated from the Bundesliga to the league.

Regionalliga Berlin									
The 1969–70 season saw two new clubs in the league, TuS Wannsee and Sportfreunde Neukölln, both promoted from the Amateurliga, while no club had been relegated from the Bundesliga to the league. For the following season the Regionalliga Berlin was reduced from 14 to 12 clubs.

Regionalliga West									
The 1969–70 season saw three new clubs in the league, DJK Gütersloh, SSVg Velbert and SpVgg Erkenschwick, all promoted from the Amateurliga, while no club had been relegated from the Bundesliga to the league.

Regionalliga Südwest									
The 1969–70 season saw two new clubs in the league, ASV Landau and SC Friedrichsthal, both promoted from the Amateurliga, while no club had been relegated from the Bundesliga to the league.

Regionalliga Süd									
The 1969–70 season saw four new clubs in the league, FSV Frankfurt and VfR Heilbronn, both promoted from the Amateurliga, while Kickers Offenbach and 1. FC Nürnberg had been relegated from the Bundesliga to the league.

Bundesliga promotion round

Group 1

Group 2

References

Sources
 30 Jahre Bundesliga  30th anniversary special, publisher: kicker Sportmagazin, published: 1993
 kicker-Almanach 1990  Yearbook of German football, publisher: kicker Sportmagazin, published: 1989, 
 DSFS Liga-Chronik seit 1945  publisher: DSFS, published: 2005

External links
Regionalliga on the official DFB website 
kicker 
Das Deutsche Fussball Archiv  Historic German league tables

1969-70
2
Ger